Pisgah Forest is an unincorporated community in Transylvania County, North Carolina, United States.   It sits at an elevation of 2100 feet (640 m) along U.S. Route 64, northeast of Brevard. It is approximately a 30-minute drive from the Asheville Regional Airport. The community lies in an area noted for its many waterfalls and white squirrels.  Pisgah Forest is a popular retirement area, at least partly because of the many hiking trails and trout streams of the nearby Pisgah National Forest and the DuPont State Forest.

Climate

Notes

References

Unincorporated communities in Transylvania County, North Carolina
Unincorporated communities in North Carolina